The Directorate General of Jute is Bangladesh's governmental regulatory agency under its ministry of textiles and jute which is responsible for the growth and expansion of its jute industry.

Its function is to work in collaboration with various research institutes, colleges and universities throughout the country to achieve advancement in jute production and diversification of jute based products.

History
The directorate general was formed in 1978, following the merger of two former ministries, "Ministry of Textiles" and "Ministry of Jute", which resulted into one cognitive state regulatory authority.

References

1978 establishments in Bangladesh
Organisations based in Dhaka
Government departments of Bangladesh